The 1948 San Diego State Aztecs football team represented San Diego State College during the 1948 college football season.

San Diego State competed in the California Collegiate Athletic Association (CCAA). The team was led by second-year head coach Bill Schutte, and played home games at both Aztec Bowl and Balboa Stadium. They finished the season with four wins and seven losses (4–7, 1–4 CCAA). Overall, the team was outscored by its opponents 158–190 for the season.

Schedule

Team players in the NFL
No San Diego State players were selected in the 1949 NFL Draft.

Notes

References

San Diego State
San Diego State Aztecs football seasons
San Diego State Aztecs football